Neophyllis a genus of lichenized fungi in the order Lecanorales. The genus contains two species found in Australasia. Originally classified in the family Cladoniaceae, the genus was transferred to the Sphaerophoraceae in 1999.

References

Lecanorales
Lecanorales genera
Lichen genera
Taxa described in 1891